Suroor may refer to:

Ayiman Suroor Al-Maawali (born 1980), known as Ayiman Suroor, Omani footballer
Suroor Barabankvi (1919–1980), Pakistani Urdu poet and lyricist
Mohammed Suroor Sabban (1898–1971), politician, economist, publisher, and poet from Saudi Arabia
Ale Ahmad Suroor, Urdu poet, critic and professor from India
Elaha Suroor (born 1988), Hazara pop singer
Majed Suroor (born 1997), Emirati association football player
Mohamed Suroor (born 1993), Emirati footballer
Saeed bin Suroor (born 1968), horse racing trainer
Shahin Suroor (born 1996), Emirati footballer

See also
Sorour
Surir
Surur